A list of films produced in Argentina in 2006:

See also
2006 in Argentina

External links and references
 Argentine films of 2006 at the Internet Movie Database

2006
Films
Argentine